41 Leonis Minoris is a single star in the northern constellation Leo Minor, located near the southern border with the neighboring constellation of Leo. It is visible to the naked eye as a dim, white-hued star with an apparent visual magnitude of 5.08. This object is located approximately 229 light years away from the Sun, based on parallax, and is drifting further away with a radial velocity of +18.5 km/s.

This is an ordinary A-type main-sequence star with a stellar classification of A3Vn, where the 'n' suffix indicates "nebulous" (broadened) lines due to rapid rotation. It is about 182 million years old with a high projected rotational velocity of 201 km/s. The star has 2.5 times the mass of the Sun and 2.1 times the Sun's radius. It is radiating 55 times the luminosity of the Sun from its photosphere at an effective temperature of 9,902 K.

References

A-type main-sequence stars
Leo Minor
BD+23 2253
Leonis Minoris, 41
092825
052457
4192